South Run (also known as South Run Creek) is a tributary of Bowman Creek in Wyoming County, Pennsylvania, in the United States. It is not designated as an impaired waterbody. The surficial geology in the vicinity of the stream consists of alluvium, alluvial terrace, and Wisconsinan Till. Its watershed is designated as a High-Quality Coldwater Fishery and a Migratory Fishery.

Course

South Run begins in a broad valley near Hickory Knob in Monroe Township. It flows in a northerly direction for several tenths of a mile before turning northwest as its valley narrows. After several tenths of a mile, the stream turns north for several tenths of a mile before turning northwest and then north again. It then reaches its confluence with Bowman Creek.

Hydrology
South Run is not designated as an impaired waterbody.

Geography and geology

The surficial geology of the land adjacent to South Run mainly consists of alluvium. However, large areas of a till known as Wisconsinan Till also occur in the stream's watershed. A patch of alluvial terrace occurs near its mouth.

There is a spring in the watershed of South Run. The spring's source is "somewhat diffuse" and it is located at the headwaters of a rill that flows into South Run.

Watershed
The stream is entirely within the United States Geological Survey quadrangle of Noxen.

Some farmstead land infringes upon the 100-year floodplain of South Run in Monroe Township.

History

South Run was entered into the Geographic Names Information System on August 2, 1979. Its identifier in the Geographic Names Information System is 1199570. The stream is also known as South Run Creek.

In 1954, a third bridge carrying State Route 2001 was built Monroe Township. One bridge over the creek is eligible for replacement, as of 2014.

Biology
The watershed of South Run is designated as a High-Quality Coldwater Fishery and a Migratory Fishery. Wild trout naturally reproduce in the stream from its headwaters downstream to its mouth.

See also
Leonard Creek, next tributary of Bowman Creek going downstream
Beaver Run (Bowman Creek), next tributary of Bowman Creek going upstream
List of rivers of Pennsylvania
List of tributaries of Bowman Creek

References

Rivers of Wyoming County, Pennsylvania
Tributaries of Bowman Creek
Rivers of Pennsylvania